In Christian theological anthropology, bipartite refers to the view that a human being is composed of two distinct components, material and immaterial, body and soul.  The two parts were created interdependent and in harmony, though corrupted through sin.

Alternative theological views of human composition include tripartite and unitary (or monistic) views.

Explanations of bipartite anthropology 

Reformation theologian John Calvin is often quoted as being in support of a bipartite view. Calvin held that while the soul and the spirit are often used interchangeably in the Bible, there are also subtle differences when the two terms are used together.

Some have held that the soul and the spirit are interchangeable and the inner life is expressed in a form of literary parallelism. Such parallelism can be found elsewhere in Scripture, such as the Psalms and the Proverbs. Others have used chemical analogies.

R. C. Sproul holds that the body and the soul are two substances which are not in conflict. They are two natures or substances, divine and human, unite in one person. In contrast with various Greek philosophical views, the material body (and the soul) is not seen as inherently evil, but inherently good. The Christian doctrine of salvation therefore does not imply a redemption from the body, but a redemption of the body and the soul.

See also 
 Christian anthropology
 Hylomorphism
 Monism
 Substance dualism
 Tripartite (theology)

References 

Christian anthropology